Breakfast is the first meal of the day.

Breakfast may also refer to:

Arts, entertainment, and media

Broadcasting
 Breakfast, the early-morning daypart period on a radio or television station when most listeners or viewers will be eating breakfast, e.g.:
 Breakfast (Australian TV program), a 2012 Australian TV program on Network Ten
 Breakfast (New Zealand TV program), a New Zealand TV program on TV One
 Saturday Breakfast, a 2011–2012 Saturday edition of the daily New Zealand program
 Breakfast (Philippine TV program), a 1999–2007 Filipino television program that aired on Studio 23
 Breakfast, a weekday radio program on BBC Radio 3
 BBC Breakfast, a British TV program simulcast on BBC One and the BBC News channel
 Breakfast News, a 1989–2000 British TV program that aired on BBC One
 Breakfast Time (British TV programme), a 1983–1989 British TV program on BBC One
 CP24 Breakfast, a Canadian TV program on CP24
 News Breakfast, or ABC News Breakfast, a 2008 Australian TV program on ABC1 and ABC News 24
 RN Breakfast, an Australian Broadcasting Corporation radio program
 The Big Breakfast, a 1992–2002 British TV program on Channel 4
 "Breakfast" (airdate 1987), the first episode of the British TV series ChuckleVision

Music

Albums
 Breakfast (Chiddy Bang album), or the title song, 2012
 Breakfast, a 1991 album by Mr Floppy, or the title song

Songs
 "Breakfast (Associates song)", a song by the Associates
 "Breakfast", a song by Brockhampton from the 2016 mixtape, All-American Trash
 "Breakfast", a song by Kelis from the 2014 album Food
 "Breakfast", a song by Newsboys from the 1996 album Take Me to Your Leader
 "Breakfast", a song by Sly Withers from the 2020 album Gardens
 "Breakfast (Syrup)", a 2012 song by Kreayshawn featuring 2 Chainz

See also
 Break fast, the meal eaten after Jewish fast days such as Yom Kippur and Tisha B'Av
 Breakfast at Tiffany's (disambiguation)
 Wedding breakfast, a British term for the meal and reception following a marriage service